Laurens Jan Brinkhorst (born 18 March 1937) is a retired Dutch politician and diplomat of the Democrats 66 (D66) party and jurist.

Early life and education
Laurens-Jan Brinkhorst was born in the city of Zwolle. His parents were Marius Jacobus Brinkhorst (1902 - 1943) and Françoise Laurence Wilhelmina Holboom (1901 - 1981). After getting his high school diploma (gymnasium-B-diploma in Dutch) he studied law at the University of Leiden (Rijksuniversiteit Leiden in Dutch), where he obtained his LL.M. degree in 1959. He also received a M.A. degree in Public Law and Government from Columbia University in New York City. Afterwards he worked at Shearman & Sterling in New York City.

Brinkhorst attended the Christian Gymnasium Sorghvliet in The Hague from June 1945 until June 1954 and applied at the Leiden University in June 1954, majoring in Law. He obtained a Bachelor of Laws degree in June 1956 before graduating with an Master of Laws degree in July 1959. Brinkhorst applied at the Columbia University in New York City in August 1959 for a postgraduate education in Political science and obtained an Bachelor of Social Science degree before graduating with an Master of Social Science in September 1961. Brinkhorst worked as a paralegal at Shearman & Sterling in New York City from September 1961 until December 1962. Brinkhorst worked as a researcher at the Leiden University from December 1962 until January 1967 and as an associate professor of International law at the Leiden University from April 1965 until January 1967 and as a professor of International law, International relations and European law at the University of Groningen from January 1967  until 11 May 1973.

Career in politics and academia
Brinkhorst served on the Provincial-Council of Groningen from July 1970 until August 1971. After the election of 1972 Brinkhorst was appointed as State Secretary for Foreign Affairs in the Cabinet Den Uyl, taking office on 19 December 1977. The Cabinet Den Uyl fell on 22 March 1977 after four years of tensions in the coalition and continued to serve in a demissionary capacity. Brinkhorst was elected as a Member of the House of Representatives after the election of 1977, taking office on 8 June 1977 but he was still serving in the cabinet and because of dualism customs in the constitutional convention of Dutch politics he couldn't serve a dual mandate he subsequently resigned as State Secretary on 8 September 1977. 

In 1977 he was again a member of the Second Chamber of the Dutch parliament for D66 and in 1981 became the leader of his party in parliament.  From 1983-1987 he was Ambassador of the European Community in Japan. After the election of 1981 the Leader of the Democrats 66 and Parliamentary leader of the Democrats 66 in the House of Representatives Jan Terlouw was appointed as Deputy Prime Minister and Minister of Economic Affairs in the Cabinet Van Agt II and Brinkhorst was selected as his successor as Parliamentary leader in the House of Representatives on 11 September 1981. After the Leader of the Democrats 66 Terlouw announced that he was stepping down as Leader following a big loss in the election of 1982 the Democrats 66 leadership appointed Brinkhorst as his successor on 8 September 1982. In October 1982 Brinkhorst was nominated as Ambassador of the European Union to Japan, he resigned as Leader and as Parliamentary leader and as a Member of the House of Representatives on 11 November 1982 and was installed as Ambassador, taking office on 1 December 1982. In December 1986 Brinkhorst was nominated as Director-General of the Scientific Committee on Consumer Safety of the European Commission, he resigned as Ambassador the same day he was installed as Director-General, serving from 1 January 1987 until his resignation 19 July 1994.  

Brinkhorst was elected as a Member of the European Parliament after the European Parliamentary election of 1994, taking office on 19 July 1994. Brinkhorst was appointed as Minister of Agriculture, Nature and Fisheries in the Cabinet Kok II following the resignation of Haijo Apotheker, taking office on 9 June 1999. In February 2002 Brinkhorst announced that he wouldn't stand for the election of 2002. The Cabinet Kok II resigned on 16 April 2002 following the conclusions of the NIOD report into the Srebrenica massacre during the Bosnian War and continued to serve in a demissionary capacity. The Cabinet Kok II was replaced by the Cabinet Balkenende I following the cabinet formation of 2002 on 22 July 2002. Brinkhorst semi-retired from active politics and became active in the private sector and public sector and worked as a senior legal advisor at NautaDutilh in Brussels from August 2002 until May 2003 and served as a distinguished professor of Governmental Studies and International relations at the Tilburg University from 1 December 2002 until 27 May 2003. 

In 1987 he became a correspondent of the Royal Netherlands Academy of Arts and Sciences. Between 1987 and 1994 Brinkhorst continued his service at the European Commission as Director-General for Environmental Affairs and Nuclear Safety. In 1994 Brinkhorst became a member of the European Parliament, serving there until 1999. 

Brinkhorst was also a member of the Provinciale Staten (the provincial parliament) of the province of Groningen for D66, a member of the board of advice of the World Resources Institute in Washington DC, a member of the board of governors of the Nederlands Economisch Instituut (Dutch Economical Institute), a professor by special appointment of international environmental law at the University of Leiden, a member of the Board of Directors of the Salzburg Seminar, a member of the Board of Directors of the International Institute of Sustainable Development, and a professor (on a temporary basis) of international environmental law at the University of Lausanne. 

On 8 June 1999 he became the minister of agriculture, environmental control and fishery in the cabinet Kok-II. Afterwards (2002) he became an Adviser of European Affairs at NautaDulith in Brussels and was awarded a professorship in transnational and European Governance at the University of Tilburg. 

After the election of 2003 Brinkhorst was appointed as Minister of Economic Affairs in the Cabinet Balkenende II, taking office on 27 May 2003. Brinkhorst was also appointed as Deputy Prime Minister following the resignation of Thom de Graaf, taking office on 31 March 2005. The Cabinet Balkenende II fell on 30 June 2006 after the Democrats 66 had lost confidence in the functioning of Minister of Integration and Asylum Affairs Rita Verdonk and continued to serve in a demissionary capacity until the Democrats 66 cabinet members resigned on 3 July 2006. Shortly thereafter Brinkhorst announced his retirement from national politics and that he wouldn't stand for the election of 2006. After the electoral defeat of D66 he became a minister of economic affairs in the second Balkenende cabinet. Brinkhorst, as well as Alexander Pechtold, resigned from his minister post after the second Balkenende cabinet lost the confidence of parliament on 29 June 2006. The next day, Balkenende offered the resignation of the full cabinet to the Dutch Queen.

He is a Senior Network Member at the European Leadership Network (ELN).

Personal life
On 26 August 1960, Brinkhorst married Jantien Heringa (born 2 February 1935 in Voorburg), daughter of Ewardus Heringa (The Hague, 14 November 1904 - The Hague, 30 November 1988) and wife (m. Utrecht, 4 August 1930) Petronela Johanna Roskam (Utrecht, 20 August 1905 - The Hague, 19 December 1991). Brinkhorst and Heringa are the parents of Marius Brinkhorst (born 9 February 1964) and the Dutch princess Laurentien Brinkhorst (born 25 May 1966), who married Prince Constantijn in 2001.

Brinkhorst retired after spending 33 years in national politics and became active in the public sector and occupied numerous seats as a nonprofit director on several boards of directors and supervisory boards (Institute of International Relations Clingendael, Energy Research Centre, Netherlands Atlantic Association, Nuclear Research and Consultancy Group, Organisation for Scientific Research, Institute for Advanced Study and the Society for Statistics and Operations Research) and served as an diplomat and lobbyist for several economic delegations on behalf of the government and as an advocate and activist for Human rights, European integration, Environmentalism, Sustainable development and Climate change. Brinkhorst also served as a distinguished professor of Governmental studies, International relations, International law and European law at the Leiden University from 1 November 2006 until 1 November 2011 and a distinguished visiting professor of International relations and Environmental law at the University of Lausanne from 1 February 2007 until 1 February 2008.

Decorations

Honorary degrees

References

External links

Official
  Mr. L.J. (Laurens Jan) Brinkhorst Parlement & Politiek

 
 

 

 
 

 
 

 
 

 

 
 

1937 births
Living people
Ambassadors of the European Union to Japan
Climate activists
Columbia University alumni
Commanders by Number of the Order of Isabella the Catholic
Commanders Crosses of the Order of Merit of the Federal Republic of Germany
Commanders of the Order of Polonia Restituta
Democrats 66 MEPs
Democrats 66 politicians
Deputy Prime Ministers of the Netherlands
Dutch environmentalists
Dutch expatriates in Belgium
Dutch expatriates in Japan
Dutch expatriates in Switzerland
Dutch expatriates in the United States
Dutch human rights activists
Dutch legal scholars
Dutch legal writers
Dutch officials of the European Union
Dutch people of Indonesian descent
Dutch political activists
Dutch political writers
Environmental studies scholars
European Union lobbyists
Foreign policy writers
Hybrid electric vehicle advocates
International law scholars
Dutch international relations scholars
Grand Cordons of the Order of the Rising Sun
Grand Crosses of the Order of the Dannebrog
Grand Officers of the Order of Orange-Nassau
Governmental studies academics
Knights Grand Cross of the Order of Merit of the Italian Republic
Knights of the Order of the Netherlands Lion
Leaders of the Democrats 66
Leiden University alumni
Academic staff of Leiden University
Ministers of Agriculture of the Netherlands
Ministers of Economic Affairs of the Netherlands
Members of the House of Representatives (Netherlands)
Members of the Provincial Council of Groningen
Members of the Royal Netherlands Academy of Arts and Sciences
MEPs for the Netherlands 1994–1999
Officiers of the Légion d'honneur
People from Zwolle
People from Leiden
People associated with Shearman & Sterling
Recipients of the Grand Cross of the Order of Leopold II
Recipients of the Grand Decoration for Services to the Republic of Austria
State Secretaries for Foreign Affairs of the Netherlands
Sustainability advocates
Academic staff of Tilburg University
Academic staff of the University of Groningen
Academic staff of the University of Lausanne
Writers about globalization
20th-century Dutch civil servants
20th-century Dutch diplomats
20th-century Dutch educators
20th-century Dutch lawyers
20th-century Dutch jurists
20th-century Dutch male writers
20th-century Dutch politicians
21st-century Dutch diplomats
21st-century Dutch educators
21st-century Dutch jurists
21st-century Dutch male writers
21st-century Dutch politicians